The Rolls-Royce Kestrel (internal type F) is a 21.25 litre (1,295 in³) V-12 aircraft engine from Rolls-Royce. It was their first cast-block engine, and used as the pattern for most of their future piston-engine designs. Used during the interwar period, it was fitted to a number of British fighters and bombers of the era, including the Hawker Fury and Hawker Hart family, and the Handley Page Heyford. The Kestrel engine was also sold to international air force customers, in this role it used to power prototypes of the German Messerschmitt Bf 109 and the Junkers Ju 87 "Stuka" dive-bomber, as the Junkers Jumo 210 engines were not ready to be fitted. Several examples of the Kestrel engine remain airworthy today.

Design and development

Origin
The Kestrel engine was engineering in response to the Curtiss D-12 engine, one of the first truly successful cast-block designs. Earlier engine designs had used individually-machined steel cylinders that were bolted onto a crankcase, whereas the cast-block design used a single block of aluminium that was machined to form the cylinders. The resulting design was lighter and significantly stronger than the separate-cylinder type, and proved simple to convert existing production facilities as it required only an investment in new machining equipment.

The Curtiss D-12 was one of the most powerful engines of its era, and continued to exchange records with other contemporary high-power engines such as the Napier Lion. At the time, none of the British aero engine manufacturers could offer an engine which offered a similar power rating which was also as light and compact as the D-12. 

Arthur Rowledge, Chief Designer at Napier and the designer of the Napier Lion engine, joined Rolls-Royce in 1921 to take up the roll as "Chief Assistant to Mr F. H. Royce". Applying the innovative features of the Curtiss D-12, Rowledge and his team designed the new engine to use 

supercharging at all altitudes, allowing it to outperform naturally aspirated engines which suffered higher performance losses as altitudes increased due to the loss in inlet air pressure.

The prototype Kestrel engine was first run in 1926, and one first flew in 1927, with a power rating of 450hp (335kW). The engine was normally aspirated in its initial form.

Improvements

The engine was first produced in 1927 at 450 hp (335 kW), which was soon improved in the I-B version to 525 hp (390 kW) by increasing the compression ratio to 7:1. The I-B variant saw widespread use in the Hawker Hart family of aircraft, a mainstay of British air power during the early 1930s. 

Development continued and the V model introduced the centrifugal supercharger, increasing power to 695hp (520kW). 

Increased availability of higher octane aviation fuels in the late 1930s allowed the engine to be boosted to higher power levels without suffering from detonation. The mark-XVI engine used in the Miles Master M.9 prototype delivered 745hp (500kW), and the XXX variant of 1940 saw service at 720hp (537kW).

Cooling system
One key advance in the Kestrel was the use of a pressurised cooling system. Water boils at 100°C at standard atmospheric pressure, but this pressure decreases as altitude increases, and therefore the boiling point of water decreases with altitude.  The amount of heat rejected by an air-to-air cooling system is a function of the maximum coolant temperature and volume, so the resulting decrease in cooling capacity became a limiting factor for aero engine power in this period, as the coolant has to be kept below boiling point.

The solution was to pressurise the engine's entire cooling system, thereby raising the temperature at which the coolant would boil: not only does this help mitigate the decrease in cooling performance with altitude, but allows a smaller cooling system to be used in the aircraft for the same heat load. The Kestrel was built to maintain coolant pressure to keep the boiling point at about 150°C.

Variants
The Kestrel was produced in 40 distinct variants which can be divided into three main groups: normally aspirated, medium supercharged, and fully supercharged. One variant, the Kestrel VIII, was configured as a 'pusher engine' for the Short Singapore flying boat. Apart from supercharging, the variant differences centred on varying compression ratios and propeller reduction gearing.

Further Development
During 1927, once the prototype of the Kestrel was complete, a need for a larger and more powerful engine was conceived for use in flying boats, and development began on an engine which utilised a 6" cylinder bore, compared to the Kestrel's 5", this became the Rolls-Royce Buzzard. The Buzzard (or "H") engine was further modified for use in the Schneider Trophy as the Rolls-Royce R engine. In 1935 the Kestrel design was used as the basis to develop the Rolls-Royce Merlin.

The Kestrel design was used as a base for both the Goshawk, however the aircraft which were intended to be fitted with the Goshawk engine were cancelled, so the project was scrapped.

The Kestrel was also used as the basis for the Peregrine (and therefore the Vulture), all utilising the same 5" piston bore and 5.5" piston stroke. In practice, development of the Peregrine and Vulture engines were curtailed, before eventually being cancelled, to allow increased resource developing the Merlin engine during the war.

As a response to the fuel injection systems developed by Bosch, in 1936 a Kestrel engine was fitted with a pressurised carburettor system to improve fuelling at high altitudes. The resulting behaviour of the engine when flight tested by the Farnborough institute was seen to be "...one of the smoothest engines they had used at high altitudes".

Applications
From Lumsden, the Kestrel may not be the main power-plant for these types.
Aircraft applications

Other applications
Speed of the Wind

Surviving engines

Several Rolls-Royce Kestrel engines remain in service, powering restored Hawker biplane types:
A Hawker Hind is owned and operated by the Shuttleworth Collection and flies regularly throughout the summer months.
A privately owned Hawker Demon resides with the Shuttleworth Collection and is the last remaining airworthy example of the type.
A Hawker Nimrod I, S1581, resides at Duxford with The Fighter Collection. Each aircraft is fitted with a Rolls-Royce Kestrel V.
A Hawker Nimrod II, K3661, resides at Duxford with the Historic Aircraft Collection and is fitted with a Rolls-Royce Kestrel VI

Engines on display
Preserved examples of the Rolls-Royce Kestrel engine are on public display at the:
Australian National Aviation Museum
Brooklands Museum
The Hangar Flight Museum
Imperial War Museum Duxford
Polish Aviation Museum Cracow
Rolls-Royce Heritage Trust
Royal Air Force Museum Cosford
Royal Air Force Museum London
Science Museum (London)
World of Wearable Arts and Classic Cars Museum (Nelson, NZ)
South Australian Aviation Museum Adelaide (Operational exhibit)

Specifications (Kestrel V)

See also

References
 Erfurth, Helmut. Junkers Ju 87 (Black Cross Volume 5). Bonn, Germany: Bernard & Graefe Verlag, 2004. .

 Lumsden, Alec. British Piston Engines and their Aircraft. Marlborough, Wiltshire: Airlife Publishing, 2003. .
 Rubbra, A.A.Rolls-Royce Piston Aero Engines - A Designer Remembers. Rolls-Royce Heritage Trust. Historical Series no 16. 1990.

Notes

Further reading
 Gunston, Bill. Development of Piston Aero Engines. Cambridge, England. Patrick Stephens Limited, 2006.

External links

Royal Air Force Museum - Rolls-Royce Kestrel
Data sheet and comparison

Kestrel
1920s aircraft piston engines